Gel-e Shur (also Romanized as Gel-e Shūr; also known as Galū Shūr, Geleh Shūr, and Goleh Shūr) is a village in Miankuh Rural District, Miankuh District, Ardal County, Chaharmahal and Bakhtiari Province, Iran. At the 2006 census, its population was 173, in 34 families.

References 

Populated places in Ardal County